William More may refer to:

William More (died 1402), MP, see City of London (elections to the Parliament of England)
William More (died 1434), MP for Cumberland (UK Parliament constituency)
William More (bishop), Bishop of Colchester from 1536 until his death in 1541
William More (prior); Prior of Worcester Cathedral until 1536
William More (died 1549), MP for Shaftesbury
William More (died 1600), MP for Reigate, Guildford, Grantham and Surrey
William More (by 1511-68 or later), MP for Derby

See also
William Moore (disambiguation)